Claudio Martínez Mehner (born in Bremen, 1970) is a Spanish piano soloist and pedagogue.

Biography
Martinez-Mehner studied at Madrid Conservatory, the Reina Sofía School of Music in Madrid, the Peabody Institute, the Moscow Conservatory, the International Piano Foundation "Theo Lieven" and the Hochschule für Musik Freiburg. He was a finalist at the 1990 Paloma O'Shea Santander International Piano Competition (Spain), to which he would return as a member of the jury in 2018; in 1992 he won the first prize at the Pilar Bayona Competition.

Claudio is a chamber music specialist, he has recorded chamber music with the Casals Quartet. As a soloist he has performed with the Munich Philharmonic, Moscow Philharmonic Orchestra, Orchestra of the Teatro Alla Scala, Scottish Chamber Orchestra, Prague Philharmonic Orchestra, Orchestra della Svizzera Italiana, North German Radio Symphony Orchestra and most of the major Spanish orchestras.

Claudio retired for seven years from the concert scena while recovering from an injury. Now he is starting to perform again both in recitals and as soloist.

Martínez Mehner held a professorship at the Conservatorio Superior de Música de Aragón. Now holds a professorship at Hochschule für Musik Basel and served as Dmitri Bashkirov's assistant at the Escuela Superior de Música Reina Sofía.

References

Spanish classical pianists
Male classical pianists
Reina Sofía School of Music alumni
Prize-winners of the Pilar Bayona Piano Competition
Madrid Royal Conservatory alumni
Moscow Conservatory alumni
Prize-winners of the Paloma O'Shea International Piano Competition
1970 births
Living people
Hochschule für Musik Freiburg alumni
21st-century classical pianists
21st-century male musicians
Spanish male musicians